Eripuram is a village within the Payyanur Taluk of Kannur district in the state of Kerala, India.

Location
Eripuram is located on the edge of the town Pazhayangadi between the cities of Payyanur and Kannur. Most of the village sits within the Ezhome census town area.

History
In the old days Eripuram was the main link from Payangadi to Ezhome, Vengara, and other destinations.

Etymology
The name Eripuram came from a Hindu mythology related to madayippara and vadukuntha siva temple. Lord Shiva got angry with Kamadevan and he burned Kamadevan in the fire from his third eye (thrikkanu). Later this place became known as Erriyicha Puram or Errinna Puram, and eventually Eripuram.

Tourist attractions
Major attractions of Eripuram are Madayippara, Parakkaulam, Madayikkavu, Vadukunda Shiva temple and Vallikketu, a Kavu (sacred grove) containing a diversity of herbal plants and rare kinds of birds.

Education
The town is the home of the Madayi Government Higher Secondary School for Girls and Boys, the Madayi co-operative bank, Taluk Hospital, the subregistrar's office, and a police station. Eripuram has a public library with a reference section.

Transportation
The national highway passes through Taliparamba town.  Goa and Mumbai can be accessed on the northern side and Cochin and Thiruvananthapuram can be accessed on the southern side.  The road to the east of Iritty connects to Mysore and Bangalore.   The nearest railway station is Pazhayangadi on Mangalore-Palakkad line. 
Trains are available to almost all parts of India subject to advance booking over the internet.  There are airports at Mangalore and Calicut. Both of them are international airports but direct flights are available only to Middle Eastern countries.

References

Villages near Kannapuram
Kannur district